During the 1999–2000 English football season, Oxford United F.C. competed in the Football League Second Division where they finished in 20th position avoiding relegation to Division Three by a single point.

Season summary
After an inconsistent start, a run of seven defeats in eight games cost manager Malcolm Shotton his job by the end of October, and made it apparent that the club would be fighting to avoid a second successive relegation. Mickey Lewis became caretaker manager, assisted by former manager Maurice Evans, and oversaw an initial upturn in form that saw the team begin to climb up the table. A poor run of form after Christmas plunged the team straight back into relegation trouble, however, leading to Lewis stepping aside in favour of another former manager, Denis Smith, in February. Results remained inconsistent at best, but in the end the team did enough to just barely avoid relegation.

Final league table

Results
Oxford United's score comes first

Legend

Football League Division Two

League Cup

FA Cup

Football League Trophy

Squad statistics

References

Oxford 1999–2000 at soccerbase.com (use drop down list to select relevant season)

See also
1999–2000 in English football

Oxford United F.C. seasons
Oxford United